Dengezlu (also Romanized as Dengezlū and Dangazlū; also known as Dahgezlī, Dangazlū-ye ‘Olyā, Dengezī, and Deng-e Zolī) is a village in Padena-ye Olya Rural District, Padena District, Semirom County, Isfahan Province, Iran. At the 2006 census, its population was 347, in 79 families.

References 

Populated places in Semirom County